The jetliner position, also known as the captain's chair, is a form of physical torment used in cases where the tormentor is unable or unwilling to inflict corporal punishment on the subject.  The recipient is made to put their back against a wall or pole and place their feet eighteen inches or so from the base of the object.  The feet are usually kept close together.  The subject must then slide down the wall or pole until their thighs are parallel to the ground, so that their profile is of someone sitting in a chair.  They may also be required to slide their feet back until their shins and thighs are at right-angles to each other, which makes the stresses upon the knee joints and thigh muscles much greater.

Variations include placing weight on the subject's head or thighs, or making them hold their arms straight out in front of them, perhaps with a weight clasped in their hands.  The result is increasing amounts of pain in the thigh muscles, as well as pain in the knees and ankles.  The benefit for the perpetrator is that this kind of punishment causes pain without any lasting marks or, under all but the most extreme conditions, lasting damage to the subjects.

In India this method of punishment is often referred to as the chair and was or is used in correcting juvenile delinquents. Also in other countries it was a commonly used punishment.

See also 
 Wall sit – a physical exercise

References

Torture